"Push Up" is a single by the British electronic music group Freestylers. The song was co-written by Theo Brehony and Rez Safinia of the pop duo Heist and features vocals from Theo. Released in 2004, it reached number one in the Flanders region of Belgium for seven weeks, number two in Australia and the Netherlands, and number five in New Zealand. In the band's home country, "Push Up" reached number 22 on the UK Singles Chart and topped the UK Dance Chart. The music video was recorded in various parts of Central London, including Piccadilly Circus. It features Kate Eloise Whitfield in various outfits dancing on the streets near crowds of people.

In 2008, the Freestylers mashed-up "Push Up" with the 1986 hit song "Word Up!" by Cameo and released it as "Push Up Word Up" through Data Records.

Track listings

UK 12-inch vinyl (Remixes)
 "Push Up" (Plump DJ's Remix)
 "Push Up" (DJ Bomba & J Paolo Remix)

UK 12-inch vinyl ("Push Up" / "The Slammer")
 "Push Up" (original)
 "The Slammer" (Clipz Remix)

Belgian CD single
 "Push Up" (radio edit) – 3:55
 "Push Up" (Plump DJ's Remix) – 7:23

Belgian maxi-single
 "Push Up" (radio edit) – 3:55
 "Push Up" (original mix) – 5:45
 "Push Up" (Plump DJ's Remix) – 7:23
 "Push Up" (DJ Bomba & J Paolo Remix) – 7:25

Australian CD single
 "Push Up" (radio edit)
 "Push Up" (Plump DJ's Remix)
 "Push Up" (DJ Bomba & J Paolo Remix)
 "Push Up" (Poxy Music Mix)

Charts

Weekly charts

Year-end charts

Certifications

References

2004 singles
2004 songs
Freestylers songs
PIAS Recordings singles
Shock Records singles
Ultratop 50 Singles (Flanders) number-one singles